WQXA-FM (105.7 FM) is a commercial radio station licensed to serve York, Pennsylvania. Owned by Cumulus Media, it broadcasts an active rock format serving South Central Pennsylvania.

History
On August 8, 1947, the Federal Communications Commission proposed a new station on 105.7 MHz. The Helm Coal Company was granted a construction permit for the new station on May 12, 1948. The station was granted its first license on May 31, 1950, with the WNOW-FM call sign. On August 1, 1957, the station's license was transferred to WNOW, Inc.

The station's license was transferred to Rust Communications Group, Inc. on June 22, 1972. The call sign was changed to WQXA effective December 1, 1973.

The station was known as "Q106" in the 1980s. In October 1989, the station's branding changed to "Hot 105.7" along with a format change to Dance Music. On November 1, 1991, the call sign was changed to WQXA-FM. In January 1993, the station performed a format stunt, intermittently switching its branding between "Hot 105.7" and "Q106", later switching to "Q106" with a Hot AC format. In May 1995, the format changed from Hot AC to active rock with a branding change to "105.7 The Edge". Later the format changed to modern rock with a branding change to "105.7 The X".

In 1997, Citadel Broadcasting purchased the station. In 2011, the United States Department of Justice approved the purchase of Citadel Broadcasting by Cumulus Media. The sale was completed September 18, 2011.

Following the sale of WTPA to the Educational Media Foundation, WQXA quietly shifted to a mainstream rock lean.

Signal
Both stations use directional antennas to reduce their signals toward each other. Other stations in the Baltimore radio market can be heard clearly in York, the location of WQXA's broadcast tower.

References

External links 
 

QXA-FM
Active rock radio stations in the United States
Cumulus Media radio stations